Loxosomella is a genus of entoproct.  individuals are solitary, not colonial, as is typically the case in this phylum.  They are sessile, attaching to a variety of substrates including sipunculan worms.  They can reproduce asexually, by budding.

References

Lophotrochozoa genera
Entoprocta